Events from the year 1997 in Sweden

Incumbents
 Monarch – Carl XVI Gustaf
 Prime Minister – Göran Persson

Events
 1 January
Skåne County is founded following a merger of the counties of Kristianstad and Malmöhus.
Kopparberg County is renamed Dalarna County.
 13 September-13 December - Planet 24 premiered the first season of a critically acclaimed reality game show franchise, Expedition Robinson, formally known as Survivor. The first series to use the formalized name would not occur until its debut on 31 May 2000. Coincidentally, both seasons were shot in islands of Malaysia. The first season was won by police officer Martin Melin.
 Date unknown: The inaugural International Science Festival in Gothenburg is held.

Popular culture

Literature
Date unknown: April Witch, novel by Majgull Axelsson, winner of the August Prize.

Sports 
 1 January: The 1997 Allsvenskan was won by Halmstads BK
 9 February: Sweden win the 1997 Bandy World Championship as hosts
 10 April: The 1997 Le Mat Trophy is won by Färjestad BK
 30 November: Sweden win the 1997 Davis Cup at home

Births

 23 May – Gustaf Nilsson, Swedish footballer
 16 December – Zara Larsson, singer

Deaths

 13 January – Sivar Arnér, novelist and playwright (born 1909).
25 January – Werner Aspenström, poet (b. 1918)
7 February – Allan Edwall, actor, director, author, composer and singer (b. 1924)
11 March — Lars Ahlin, writer and aesthetician (b. 1915)
11 March – Stefan Fernholm, discus thrower and shot putter (b. 1959)
12 April – Ivar Eriksson, footballer (b. 1909)
1 May – Bo Widerberg, film director, writer, editor and actor (b. 1930)
22 June – Ted Gärdestad, singer-songwriter (b. 1956)
4 July – Bengt Danielsson, anthropologist (b. 1921)
3 October – Jarl Kulle, film and stage actor and director (b. 1927)
14 December – Torsten Nilsson, politician (b. 1905)

References

 
Years of the 20th century in Sweden
Sweden
1990s in Sweden
Sweden